Brigantiaea leucoxantha is a species of crustose lichen in the family Brigantiaeaceae. It was first described as a new species by German botanist Kurt Polycarp Joachim Sprengel in 1820, as Lecidea leucoxantha.  Rolf Santesson and Josef Hafellner transferred it to the genus Brigantiaea in 1982.

References

Teloschistales
Lichen species
Lichens described in 1820
Lichens of Europe
Lichens of North America